The Sansa e200 series is a portable media player developed by SanDisk, and released on January 5, 2006. The device is available in four capacities of Flash memory: 2 GB (e250), 4 GB (e260), 6 GB (e270), and 8 GB (e280). All players have a 1.8-inch, TFT LCD display with a resolution of 176 by 220 pixels. Certain files, if not in a format accepted by the player's original firmware, must first be converted with the Sansa Media Converter Windows software. This will convert images to bitmap format (.bmp) and videos to MJPEG (in a .mov container), for v1 models. On v2 players it will convert videos to DivX and simply resize images. It is not possible to simply copy videos to the device, even if they seem to be in the correct format; trying to access them displays an error message.

Features
The Sansa e200 series can display album art and display song information, thanks to the audio files' ID3 content. The players are powered by a user-replaceable (offered as replacement set by SanDisk and some competitors) lithium ion battery that is also rechargeable, and come with a built-in expansion slot for microSD cards, an FM tuner with a recording function (only available in North America, Japan, New Zealand, Australia and some other countries), and microphone for voice recording.
 
SanDisk released a version 2 of the e200 series in December 2007 with internal hardware different from the first version. Version 2 changes include support for Rhapsody channels through RhapPFS DRM (Plays For Sure enhanced to support Rhapsody channels), support for Audible audio books, microSDHC, and DivX, and also has a different boot screen and adds the ability to format the device, among other minor improvements.

Issues 

The player lacks Asian text support when displaying song names and artists, but users can patch the firmware to add support.  Rockbox firmware also supports the e200 series just as it supports the c200 series, and adds the same features.

The standard firmware for e200 models with version 1 hardware is not compatible with the newer microSDHC format (generally 4GB and higher); Rockbox firmware adds this support. Rockbox also supports e200 models with version 2 hardware.

A number of bugs in the firmware cause problems. One introduces a 0.2 second delay between tracks, even those that are consecutive to a given album. This is most noticeable on musical tracks where the song does not fade completely out before the next begins. Artists whose names begin with "The" are listed incorrectly as well. For unknown reasons, the order of tracks on a given album play in alphabetical order, seriously disrupting the continuity of the listening experience.

The early firmware for version 2 units (firmware version information is under Settings >> Info) removed the ability for unsupported operating systems (Linux, FreeBSD, etc.) to see the internal storage as a standard flash drive when plugged in via the USB port. Version 1 players had a menu option under the Settings menu for storage mode that could be toggled to show up as standard USB flash drive. For V2 Sansa players with firmware version V03.01.11, this option has been completely removed from the settings menu. Upgrading to later firmware versions, V03.01.14 or V03.01.16 will restore the USB Mode menu option under the Settings menu. Under the USB Mode menu are three choices - Auto Detect, Media Transfer Protocol (MTP), and USB mass-storage class (MSC). MSC is Mass Storage Class where the computer would see the Sansa as a regular flash drive. MTP is Media Transfer Protocol which is a Microsoft-specific mode invented to deal with media files that include Digital Rights Management.

e200R Series 
The Sansa e200R was released in October 2006. Physically identical to the regular Sansa e200, this player is sold exclusively at Best Buy, or directly through Rhapsody, the RealNetworks digital music store. The main differences in the e200R is the firmware and bootloader, which are not easily interchangeable with the e200. The player has a feature called "Rhapsody Channels", which is the online service's brand of podcasting, and also comes with pre-loaded content. Models with smaller capacities will receive about 1 GB of pre-loaded content, while bigger ones will have approximately 2 GB. It also anti-aliases the text displayed, and has different names for the USB modes.898141

See also 
 SanDisk
 SanDisk Sansa
 Sansa c200 Series
 Sansa Fuze
 Comparison of portable media players

References

External links 
SanDisk Sansa Micro Site

Digital audio players
Portable media players
SanDisk products

ru:Sansa#Sansa серии e200